Raphitoma nivea is a species of sea snail, a marine gastropod mollusk in the family Raphitomidae.

Description
This species has a broad twisted apex of two whorls. It resembles Raphitoma echinata (Brocchi, 1814) (synonym of Raphitoma reticulata Renier, 1804) in size, sculpture, and outlines, but R. echinata has a slender and acute apex of four whorls.

Distribution
This marine species occurs off Algeria.

References

 Gofas, S.; Le Renard, J.; Bouchet, P. (2001). Mollusca. in: Costello, M.J. et al. (eds), European Register of Marine Species: a check-list of the marine species in Europe and a bibliography of guides to their identification. Patrimoines Naturels. 50: 180-213.

External links
 Sykes E. R. 1906. On the Mollusca procured during the "Porcupine" Expeditions 1869-1870. Supplemental notes, part III. Proceedings of the Malacological Society of London 7: 173-190, pl. 16
 

nivea
Gastropods described in 1875